Space Tug is a young adult science fiction novel by author Murray Leinster.  It was published in 1953 by Shasta Publishers in an edition of 5,000 copies.  It is the second novel in the author's Joe Kenmore series. Groff Conklin gave it a mixed review in Galaxy, noting that it held "plenty of excitement though not much maturity." Boucher and McComas preferred it to the series's initial volume, but still found it "quite a notch below ... Leinster's adult work." P. Schuyler Miller reported the novel was marked by "the fastest kind of action" and "the feeling of technical authenticity."

Plot introduction
The novel concerns the problems of the running of a space station.

Publication history
 1953, US, Shasta Publishers , Pub date 1953, Hardback
 1955, US, Pocket Books , Pub date 1955, Paperback
 1957, Germany, Utopia-Grossband, Pub date 1957, Hardback, as Zwischen Erde und Mond
 1965, US, Belmont , Pub date 1965, Paperback
 1966, Germany, Terra Extra, Pub date 1966, Hardback, as Zwischen Erde und Mond
 1972, the Netherlands, Luitingh-Sijthoff, Pub date 1972, Paperback, as Sabotage 2: Pendeldienst

References

Sources

External links
 
 

1953 American novels
1953 science fiction novels
American science fiction novels
American young adult novels
Children's science fiction novels
Novels by Murray Leinster
Space exploration novels
1953 children's books